In computer science, a bounded pointer is a pointer that is augmented with additional information that enable the storage bounds within which it may point to be deduced. This additional information sometimes takes the form of two pointers holding the upper and lower addresses of the storage occupied by the object to which the bounded pointer points.

Use of bound information makes it possible for a compiler to generate code that performs bounds checking, i.e. that tests if a pointer's value lies within the bounds prior to dereferencing the pointer or modifying the value of the pointer. If the bounds are violated some kind of exception may be raised.  This is especially useful for data constructs such as arrays in C.

See also
 Bounds-checking elimination
 Smart pointer
 Tagged pointer

References 

Data types